The Kura–Araxes culture, also named Kur–Araz culture, Mtkvar-Araxes culture or the Early Transcaucasian culture was a civilization that existed from about 4000 BC until about 2000 BC, which has traditionally been regarded as the date of its end; in some locations it may have disappeared as early as 2600 or 2700 BC. The earliest evidence for this culture is found on the Ararat plain; it spread north in the Caucasus by 3000 BC.

Altogether, the early Transcaucasian culture enveloped a vast area approximately 1,000 km by 500 km, and mostly encompassed the modern-day territories of the South Caucasus (except western Georgia), northwestern Iran, the northeastern Caucasus, eastern Turkey, and as far as Syria.

The name of the culture is derived from the Kura and Araxes river valleys. Kura–Araxes culture is sometimes known as Shengavitian, Karaz (Erzurum), Pulur, and Yanik Tepe (Iranian Azerbaijan, near Lake Urmia) cultures. It gave rise to the Khirbet Kerak-ware culture found in the Levant and Trialeti-Vanadzor culture of the South Caucasus and Armenian Highlands.

Early history 
The formative processes of the Kura-Araxes cultural complex, and the date and circumstances of its rise, have been long debated.

Shulaveri-Shomu culture preceded the Kura–Araxes culture in the area. There were many differences between these two cultures, so the connection was not clear. Later, it was suggested that the Sioni culture of eastern Georgia possibly represented a transition from the Shulaveri to the Kura-Arax cultural complex.

At many sites, the Sioni culture layers can be seen as intermediary between Shulaver-Shomu-Tepe layers and the Kura-Araxes layers. This kind of stratigraphy warrants a chronological place of the Sioni culture at around 4000 BCE.

Some scholars consider the Kartli and Kakheti areas  as key to forming the earliest phase of the Kura–Araxes culture. To a large extent, this appears as an indigenous culture of Caucasus that was formed over a long period, and at the same time incorporating foreign influences.

There are some indications (such as at Arslantepe) of the overlapping in time of the Kura-Araxes and Uruk cultures; such contacts may go back even to the Middle Uruk period.

Some scholars have suggested that the earliest manifestation of the Kura-Araxes phenomenon should be dated at least to the last quarter of the 5th millennium BC. This is based on the recent data from Ovçular Tepesi, a Late Chalcolithic settlement located in Nakhchivan by the Arpaçay river.

Expansion 

Rather quickly, elements of Kura–Araxes culture started to proceed westward to the Erzurum plain, southwest to Cilicia, and to the southeast into the area of Lake Van, and below the Urmia basin in Iran, such as to Godin Tepe.  Finally, it proceeded into the present-day Syria (Amuq valley), and as far as Palestine.

Its territory corresponds to large parts of modern Armenia, Azerbaijan, Chechnya, Dagestan, Georgia, Ingushetia, North Ossetia, and parts of Iran and Turkey.

At Sos Hoyuk, in Erzurum Province, Turkey, early forms of Kura-Araxes pottery were found in association with local ceramics as early as 3500-3300 BC. During the Early Bronze Age in 3000-2200 BC, this settlement was part of the Kura-Araxes phenomenon.

At Arslantepe, Turkey, around 3000 BCE, there was widespread burning and destruction, after which Kura-Araxes pottery appeared in the area.

According to Geoffrey Summers, the movement of Kura-Araxes peoples into Iran and the Van region, which he interprets as quite sudden, started shortly before 3000 BC, and may have been prompted by the 'Late Uruk Collapse' (end of the Uruk period), taking place at the end of Uruk IV phase c. 3100 BC.

Cultural connections 
Kura–Araxes culture is closely linked to the approximately contemporaneous Maykop culture of the North Caucasus. The two cultures seem to have influenced one another.

Economy
The economy was based on farming and livestock-raising (especially of cattle and sheep). They grew grain and orchard crops, and are known to have used implements to make flour. They raised cattle, sheep, goats, dogs, and in later phases, horses.

Before the Kura-Araxes period, horse bones were not found in Transcaucasia. Later, beginning about 3300 BCE, they became widespread, with signs of domestication.

There is evidence of trade with Mesopotamia as well as Asia Minor. It is, however, considered above all to be indigenous to the Caucasus, and its major variants characterized (according to Caucasus historian Amjad Jaimoukha) later major cultures in the region.

Settlements 
Archaeological evidence of inhabitants of the Kura–Araxes culture showed that ancient settlements were found along the Hrazdan river, as shown by drawings at a mountainous area in a cave nearby. Structures in settlements have not revealed much differentiation, nor was there much difference in size or character between settlements, facts that suggest they probably had a poorly developed social hierarchy for a significant stretch of their history. Some, but not all, settlements were surrounded by stone walls. They built mud-brick houses, originally round, but later developing into subrectangular designs with structures of just one or two rooms, multiple rooms centered around an open space, or rectilinear designs.

At some point the culture's settlements and burial grounds expanded out of lowland river valleys and into highland areas. Although some scholars have suggested that this expansion demonstrates a switch from agriculture to pastoralism and that it serves as possible proof of a large-scale arrival of Indo-Europeans, facts such as that settlement in the lowlands remained more or less continuous suggest merely that the people of this culture were diversifying their economy to encompass crop and livestock agriculture.

Shengavit Settlement is a prominent Kura-Araxes site in present-day Yerevan area in Armenia. It was inhabited from approximately 3200 BC cal to 2500 BC cal. Later on, in the Middle Bronze Age, it was used irregularly until 2200 BC cal. The town occupied an area of six hectares, which is large for Kura-Araxes sites.

Metallurgy

In the earliest phase of the Kura–Araxes culture, metal was scarce. In comparison, the preceding Leilatepe culture's metalwork tradition was far more sophisticated.

The Kura–Araxes culture would later display "a precocious metallurgical development, which strongly influenced surrounding regions". They worked copper, arsenic, silver, gold, tin, and bronze.

Their metal goods were widely distributed, from the Volga, Dnieper and Don-Donets river systems in the north to Syria and Palestine in the south and Anatolia in the west.

Pottery

Their pottery was distinctive. The spread of their pottery along trade routes into surrounding cultures was much more impressive than any of their achievements domestically. It was painted black and red, using geometric designs. Examples have been found as far south as Syria and Israel, and as far north as Dagestan and Chechnya. The spread of this pottery, along with archaeological evidence of invasions, suggests that the Kura-Araxes people may have spread outward from their original homes and, most certainly, had extensive trade contacts. Jaimoukha believes that its southern expanse is attributable primarily to Mitanni and the Hurrians.

According to Giulio Palumbi (2008), the typical red-black ware of Kura–Araxes culture originated in eastern Anatolia, and then moved on to the Caucasus area. But then these cultural influences came back to Anatolia mixed in with other cultural elements from the Caucasus.

Viticulture
Viticulture and wine-making were widely practised in the area from the earliest times. Viticulture even goes back to the earlier Shulaveri-Shomu culture.

The earliest evidence of domesticated grapes in the world has been found at Gadachrili Gora, near the village of Imiri, Marneuli Municipality, in southeastern Republic of Georgia; carbon-dating points to the date of about 6000 BC.

Grape pips dating back to the V-IVth millennia BC were found in Shulaveri; others dating back to the IVth millennium BC were found in Khizanaant Gora—all in this same 'Shulaveri area' of the Republic of Georgia.

A theory has been suggested by Stephen Batiuk that the Kura-Araxes folk may have spread Vitis vinifera vine and wine technology to the "Fertile Crescent"—to Mesopotamia and the Eastern Mediterranean. The spread of the wine-goblet form, such as represented by the Khirbet Kerak ware, is clearly associated with these peoples. The same applies to the large ceramic vessels used for grape fermentation.

Burial customs
Inhumation practices are mixed. Flat graves are found but so are substantial kurgan burials, the latter of which may be surrounded by dolmen. This points to a heterogeneous ethno-linguistic population (see section below).

Analyzing the situation in the Kura-Araxes period, T. A. Akhundov notes the lack of unity in funerary monuments, which he considers more than strange in the framework of a single culture; for the funeral rites reflect the deep culture-forming foundations and are weakly influenced by external customs. There are non-kurgan and kurgan burials, burials in ground pits, in stone boxes and crypts, in the underlying ground strata and on top of them; using both the round and rectangular burials; there are also substantial differences in the typical corpse position. Burial complexes of Kura–Araxes culture sometimes also include cremation.

Here one can come to the conclusion that the Kura–Araxes culture developed gradually through a synthesis of several cultural traditions, including the ancient cultures of the Caucasus and nearby territories.

Late Kura-Araxes sites often featured Kurgans of greatly varying sizes, with larger, wealthier kurgans surrounded by smaller kurgans containing less wealth. These kurgans also contained a wide assortment metalworks. This trend suggests the eventual emergence of a marked social hierarchy. Their practice of storing relatively great wealth in burial kurgans was probably a cultural influence from the more ancient civilizations of the Fertile Crescent to the south.

In the 3rd millennium B.C., one particular group of mounds of the Kura–Araxes culture is remarkable for their wealth. This was the final stage of culture's development. These burial mounds are known as the Martqopi (or Martkopi) period mounds. Those on the left bank of the river Alazani are often 20–25 meters high and 200–300 meters in diameter. They contain especially rich artefacts, such as gold and silver jewelry.

Ethno-linguistic makeup 
While it is unknown what languages were present in Kura-Araxes, the two most widespread theories suggest a connection with Hurro-Urartian and/or Anatolian languages. In the Armenian hypothesis of Indo-European origins, this culture (and perhaps that of the Maykop culture) is identified with the speakers of the Anatolian languages.

Others have suggested the possibility that Kartvelian, Northeast Caucasian, and Semitic languages were spoken in the region as well.

See also 
 Leyla-Tepe culture
 Prehistoric Azerbaijan
 Prehistoric Armenia
 Prehistoric Georgia
 Aşağımollahasan höyük

References

Sources 

 Stephen Batiuk, Mitchell Rothman, Early Transcaucasian Cultures and Their Neighbors. University Museum of the University of Pennsylvania: Expedition, 2007
 
 James P. Mallory, "Kuro-Araxes Culture", Encyclopedia of Indo-European culture, Fitzroy Dearborn, 1997.

External links 
 Giorgi L. Kavtaradze, The Chronology of the Caucasus During the Early Metal Age: Observations from Central Transcaucasus 2004. (alternative site)
 Kura-Arax Pottery – Karnut I (2900-2500 BC) The Kura-Arax Pottery Technology Database (KAPTech)
 The Beginnings of Metallurgy – includes extensive discussion of Kura-Araxes metalworking
 Toby Wilkinson (2009), Pathways and highways: routes in Bronze Age Eurasia, ArchAtlas, Version 4.1 – Accessed: 9 November 2015
 Dieneke's Anthropology Blog (2013), Origin of Early Transcaucasian Culture (aka Kura-Araxes culture)
Shengavit - a Kura Araxes Culture Site in Yerevan on the Ararat hills, Republic of Armenia. By Hakop Simonyan, 2000-2008 season field director
Problems of Early Metal Age Archaeology of Caucasus and Anatolia. Proceedings of International Conference; November 19–23, 2014, Georgia; edited by G. Narimanishvili. Tbilisi, 2014 305 pages 
The spatial organization of craft production at the Kura-Araxes settlement of Köhne Shahar in northwestern Iran: A zooarchaeological approach - PLOS ONE March 4, 2020 - Siavash Samei and Karim Alizadeh

 
Bronze Age cultures of Asia
Chalcolithic cultures of Asia
Archaeological cultures of West Asia
Archaeological cultures of the Caucasus
Archaeological cultures in Armenia
Archaeological cultures in Azerbaijan
Archaeological cultures in Georgia (country)
Archaeological cultures in Iran
Archaeological cultures in Turkey
Urartu
Nakh peoples
Prehistoric Anatolia
Prehistoric Azerbaijan
Prehistoric Iran